Deh Bureh may refer to:
 Deh Bureh, Asadabad
 Deh Bureh, Nahavand